Khlong Bang Phai station is the terminal station of the Bangkok MRT Purple Line. Located on Kanchanaphisek Road, Bang Bua Thong District, Nonthaburi Province. The MRT Purple Line Depot is located near here.

Khlong Bang Phai station (P1) is above the centre line of the Kanchanapisek road between Khlong Bang Phai and the Khlong Thanon area, south of the Chan Thong Lam road. The three-level station has a centre-platform, and is approximately 300m long.

To its east is the Rattanawadi village, and the MRT Purple Line Depot, housing the main maintenance workshop, operations control centre, railway system operations, and a three-floor Park & Ride building. To the west the station serves commuters from the Bua Thong residential area. The Regency and Suphanan villages are here.

The station has four entrances from the Karnjanapisek road at street level.

Gallery

References

External links
Khlong Bang Phai MRT Station

MRT (Bangkok) stations